Cian Prendergast (born 23 February 2000) is an Irish rugby union player for Connacht in the United Rubgy Championship. He attended school in Newbridge College, Co. Kildare. Prendergast's primary position is lock or flanker.

Early life and education
Prendergast grew up in County Kildare and attended Newbridge College where he played rugby and captained the Leinster schools team. He also played Gaelic football for Suncroft.

He has a younger brother Sam Prendergast, who is currently playing for Leinster Rugby and the Ireland U20 Six Nations Team.

Rugby career

Prendergast joined the Connacht academy in summer 2020. The following October he made his senior debut in Round 3 of the 2020–21 Pro14 against Edinburgh. In March 2021, Connacht announced that he had signed a professional contract with the club. In May 2022, and with one year on his deal still to run, Connacht announced a new longer term contract to keep him at the club until 2025.

International career
Prendergast was included as a development player in the Irish squad for the 2022 Six Nations Championship.
In June 2022, he was included in the Ireland squad for the 2022 tour of New Zealand. In November 2022, Prendergast was named on the bench and subsequently gained his first full cap in a test victory  against Fiji. In January 2023 he was named in Ireland's squad for the Six Nations.

References

External links

2000 births
Living people
Connacht Rugby players
Rugby union locks
Rugby union flankers
Irish rugby union players
Rugby union players from County Kildare
Ireland international rugby union players